Santa Marta is a municipality (population 4,157) in the Spanish province of Badajoz, in the autonomous community of Extremadura.

Municipalities in the Province of Badajoz